Běchary is a municipality and village in Jičín District in the Hradec Králové Region of the Czech Republic. It has about 300 inhabitants.

Administrative parts
The village of Běchárky is an administrative part of Běchary.

Geography
It lies on the border between the Central Elbe Table and Jičín Uplands.

History
The first written mention of Běchary is from 1290.

Gallery

References

External links

Villages in Jičín District